Rudi na záletech  is a 1911 Austro-Hungarian comedy film. It's one of a series of four films written by and starring Emil Artur Longen as the title character, Rudi. It was filmed in Prague.

The short comedy is about a sailor called Rudi, who gets chased around the beach.

References

External links
 

1911 comedy films
1911 films
Austro-Hungarian films
Czech black-and-white films
Hungarian black-and-white films
Austrian black-and-white films
Austrian silent films
Hungarian comedy films
Austrian comedy films
Films directed by Emil Artur Longen
Czech comedy films